The village of Klein Hehlen was incorporated in 1939 by law into the adjacent town of Celle. The suburb is northwest of the town centre.

Politics 
The chair of the parish council (Ortsbürgermeister) is Klaus Didschies (CDU).

Culture and points of interest 

 The Church of St Boniface (Bonifatiuskirche) was built in 1657 as a cemetery chapel on the hill of Harburger Berg. In the meantime, from 1758 to 1902, it was used as a garrison church. 300 years after it was built the timber-framed building was moved in 1957 to its present site. The pulpit, donated by Duke Christian Louis, dates to the year 1659; the altar came from Großburgwedel and dates to 1690.
 The (since reduced) collection of books in the former court library founded in the 16th century by Ernest the Confessor, Duke of Brunswick-Lüneburg, was merged with the 40,000 books in the library of the Celle-Klein Hehlen theological seminary. This public, religious, academic specialist library offers today a collection of 62,000 books, which are accessible free to those who are interested.

Economy and infrastructure 

 The state firefighting school in Celle was founded in 1931 and is located in Klein Hehlen. The present-day Lower Saxon State Firefighting School (Niedersächsische Landesfeuerwehrschule has a capacity of 160 student places and is a public-law  institution with initial and continuation training for members of the volunteer and professional fire services.
 Opposite the firefighting school is the Celle Road Maintenance Office which carries out road inspections and maintenance as well as winter services for the district of Celle.

References

External links 
 The official website of the town of Celle

Celle